State Highway 233 (SH 233) was a state highway in Pueblo County, Colorado. SH 233's southern terminus was at U.S. Route 50 Business (US 50 Bus.) west of Vineland, and the northern terminus was at U.S. Route 50 (US 50) and SH 96 in Baxter. The highway was decommissioned in 2017, when ownership was transferred to Pueblo County.

Route description

Major intersections

References

External links

233
Transportation in Pueblo County, Colorado